The International Kurdish Theater Festival is the most important theater festival in the Kurdish regions of Iran, Rojhalat, which has been held in Saqqez city, since December 1999, with the participation of professional theater groups from different parts of Iran and abroad. So far, 16 periods of this festival have been held, the last of which was on December 19–22, 2019. This festival is organized by the Ministry of Culture and Islamic Guidance of Iran.

‌History 
The Kurdish Theater Festival was founded in the early 90's and started its activities in the late 90's by solving various problems along the way. By holding different periods of this festival, it was finally promoted to a well-known position among different segments of the people in the Kurdish provinces as well as among Iranian theater artists. The first Kurdish Theater Festival was held in 1999 and the last in 2019. It is now more than twenty years since the first Saqqez Kurdish Theater Festival was held, and the performance of this cultural and artistic event has been accompanied by many ups and downs during these years. After holding 6 periods during the years 1999 to 2004, the process of holding it stopped, but from 2008 this cultural and artistic event started again and continued until 2011, then it was closed and from 2014 the 11th period of this festival was held and Until 2019, the 16th edition of this festival was held. To hold the 17th edition of the festival, after the COVID-19 pandemic, the Ministry of Culture and Islamic Guidance needs to allocate a budget line.

Festival Awards 

These awards include the following:
Festival statue
Special Director Award
Special Award for Male Acting
Special Award for Actress
Special Scene Design Award
Special poster design award
Special Music Award
and some other award and cash prizes

Results of recent festivals

The 16th edition of the festival 
During this period, nine theater groups from Iran and two foreign theater groups succeeded in showing their works. The play "Ahki Nishtmani Daholik" from Turkey directed by "Ozel Tunjai" and also the play "Bauk" from Sulaimaniyah of Iraqi Kurdistan region directed by "Siddiq Aziz Bavan" were present in this festival as foreign groups.

Special award for directing "Siddiq Aziz" for the play Buck from Sulaymaniyah, Iraq
Special Award for Actress to Ms. "Khe Roman" for her role in the play Bauk from Sulaymaniyah
Special Award for Best Actor to زلzel Tünjai for his performance at the Academy in Istanbul, Turkey
Special Award for Best Actor to "Shah Mal Abe Rahsh" for his performance in the book "Bawk" from Sulaimaniyah, Iraq
Special male acting award to "Peyman Babaian" for his performance in the legend of the tiger from Mahabad

The 15th edition of the festival 
This period of the festival was held from 1 to 5 December 2018 and the secretary of this period was Ghotbeddin Sadeghi. During this period, 69 theater groups sent the text of the play and the CD of their performance to the secretariat of the Saqqez Kurdish Theater Festival, which included 14 plays from Syrian Kurdistan or Rojava, Iraqi Kurdistan or Bashour and Turkish  Kurdistan or Bakour. Selected works by the jury:

"Kacheh Se Talikeh" directed by Fateh Badparva from Marivan
"He Nari" directed by Qutbuddin Sadeghi from Sanandaj
"We all are fine" directed by Saman Mehran and Farzad Hassan Mirzaei from Baneh
The play "in front of hell Door" from Sulaymaniyah, Iraqi Kurdistan

Gallery

References

External links 
Photo report of the closing ceremony of the 15th Saqqez International Kurdish Theater Festival, the Ministry of Culture and Islamic Guidance of Iran official website, 
Performance Traditions of Kurdistan: Towards a More Comprehensive Theatre History, Mehroo Rashid Rostami, 2018

 List of theatre festivals
Festivals
 
Theatre festivals in Iran
Festivals established in 1990
Tourist attractions in Tehran
Annual events in Iran
Saqqez County